Eupithecia pucatrihue is a moth in the family Geometridae. It is found in the regions of Santiago (Santiago Province), Araucania (Malleco and Cautin provinces) and Los Lagos (Osomo Province) in Chile. The habitat consists of the Central Valley, the Northern Valdivian Forest and the Valdivian Forest biotic provinces.

The length of the forewings is about 10 mm for males and 9-10.5 mm for females. The forewings are dark brown, with some grey and blackish brown scaling. The hindwings are brown and paler than the forewings, with groups of blackish brown scales along the anal margin. Adults have been recorded on wing in October, December, February and March.

Etymology
The specific name is based on the type locality.

References

Moths described in 1987
pucatrihue
Moths of South America
Endemic fauna of Chile